The Embassy of Ukraine, Rome is an embassy located in Rome, Italy. It is hosts the primary diplomatic mission from Ukraine to the Italian Republic. It is also concurrently accredited to the Republic of San Marino and the Republic of Malta.

History of Diplomatic Relations Between Ukraine and Italy 
Ukraine and Italy established diplomatic relations in 1992, soon after Ukraine independence from the Soviet Union. The Italian government supported the 2004 Orange Revolution in Ukraine. Italy also supported Ukraine's claim to the Crimean Peninsula over Russia's claim in the 2014 Crimean Crisis.

Like other Western European countries, Italy has welcomed Ukraine's attempts in recent years to have closer ties to the European Union and NATO. Nevertheless, Italian-Ukrainian relations are not entirely harmonious. Italy opened and maintains informal diplomatic offices in the Donetsk People's Republic and the Luhansk People's Republic. The DPR and LPR declared independence from Ukraine in 2014 with the help of Russia, however Ukraine considers them to be rebellious provinces whose declarations of independence lacked legal basis (see War in Donbass and Russo-Ukrainian War). On a visit to Italy in February 2020, Ukrainian President Volodymyr Zelenskyy urged Italian Prime Minister Giuseppe Conte to shut down Italy's "illegal" diplomatic offices in the DPR and the LPR.

In addition to the Ukrainian embassy in Rome, Ukraine maintains consulates in the Italian cities of Florence, Bari, and Milan. Italy maintains an embassy in the Ukrainian capital, Kyiv.

Known Ambassadors from Ukraine to Italy 
 Borys Hudyma (2000 - April 4, 2004)
 Yevhen Perelygin (February 14, 2013 - July 15, 2020)
 Perelyhin Yevhen Yuriiovych (September 21, 2020 - )

See also 
 Foreign relations of Italy
 Foreign relations of Ukraine
 List of diplomatic missions in Italy
 List of diplomatic missions of Ukraine

References 

Italy–Ukraine relations
Rome
Ukraine